Paracymoriza scotalis is a moth in the family Crambidae. It was described by George Hampson in 1906. It is found in Angola, the Democratic Republic of the Congo, South Africa, Tanzania, Zambia and Zimbabwe.

The wingspan is 29–40 mm. The forewings are dark brown, but paler along the veins. There is a pale narrow subbasal fascia, a pale antemedian fascia, a blackish discal spot and a pale postmedian fascia. The hindwings are pale fuscous with a pale median fascia. Adults are on wing from March to May and in September and November.

References

Acentropinae
Moths described in 1906